Bhorle may refer to:

Bhorle, Bagmati, Nepal
Bhorle, Dhawalagiri, Nepal